Derivatives law is the area of law governing derivatives. It is associated with principles of contract law, and practitioners must also have a good understanding of insolvency, netting and set-off, and conflict of laws.

Over-the-counter derivatives are documented under master agreements, the most common of which is the International Swaps and Derivatives Association (ISDA) Master Agreement. 

Contract law
Financial regulation
Derivatives (finance)